The Quarteira River is a small river in the Portuguese region of the Algarve. The river begins at the conflux of two tributary rivers a little north of the village of Paderne. The tributary rivers are the River de Alte and the River de Algibre.

Description 
The Quarteira is one of a number of small rivers in the central Algarve which make up the water ecosystem known as the Querença – Silves Aquifer System.

Places of interest 
A short distance from the confluence of the Quarteira the river passes the village of Paderne and then snakes in a large loop around a hill which is topped by the remains of the Moorish Castle of Paderne. Below the castle are the remnants of two watermills. The first is to the Acudes do Castelo which is in the north-west valley below the castle and the second watermill is called Alfarrobeiro and is south of the castle. Next to this watermill stands a Bridge built by the Romans. 
The Roman bridge is location on the rocky peninsular bend and was of strategic importance to the Romans, as it controlled the ancient Roman road Via Lusitanorum.

Gallery

References 

Rivers of Portugal
Rivers of the Algarve
Natura 2000 in Portugal